The Science/Engineering Specialized Learning Center, S&E or SnE, is a public high school magnet program housed within Manalapan High School, located in Englishtown, in Monmouth County, New Jersey, United States. The program, started in 1985, is designed for students with an interest in focusing on mathematical and scientific subjects.

The program has had 10 to 40 students in each class, which has recently been changed to a maximum of 30 per class, and the curriculum consists largely of courses related to engineering, science, and high level mathematics. The program has many Advanced Placement (AP) courses, which can provide college credit with appropriate scores (3, 4, or 5). A member of the Freehold Regional High School District, the learning center serves no more than 100 students at any time.

Applicants, drawn from the communities in the Freehold Regional High School District, take an entrance exam in the eighth grade that tests their abilities in mathematics and English. In addition, there is also a personal statement portion of the application which allows students to write an essay on why they wish to go to the school as well as telling of their extracurricular activities or awards. Parents have been known to move into the district just so their children may have a chance to be accepted into S&E.

The program has knowledgeable and helpful teachers. Most students score very highly on standardized tests (AP, SAT, ACT Exam, PSAT/NMSQT, High School Proficiency Assessment). In 2006, the average SAT score was 2,185: 713 Verbal, 770 Math, and 702 Writing, and more recent SAT scores have been similar. If this center was ranked as a separate high school, it would rank #2 out of more than 27,000 U.S. high schools based on SAT scores. However, as a STEM focused school it would place higher than top schools like High Technology High School. It also performs well in competitions such as the American Mathematics Contest or the Science League.

The program also provides students with the opportunity to get involved with internships and research, through the Honors Engineering Research course students take their senior year. For each half of the year, students can work on a research project or an individual supervised learning experience (SLE). For research projects, students can choose from eight topics: astronomy, computer interfacing, fluid statics and dynamics, laser art and communication, magnetic forces and fields, mathematical models, robotics, and alternative energy and environmental concerns. During these projects, students are encouraged to set and meet goals, and keep a log of their progress. For SLE's, the program helps place students at internships at local companies, including engineering firms, manufacturing firms, software development firms, telecommunications firms, solar energy installation companies, and public utility companies. Students are also able to pursue opportunities they find on their own. At the end of each half of the school year, students give final presentations summing up their work to their peers.

Required courses

Freshman year
Freshman year is often regarded as the easiest year of the four in the program.
Honors Algebra II/ Honors Geometry  - A combined course in which two classes usually offered separately are taught at an accelerated pace over the span of one year. Typically, Geometry is taught the first semester then Algebra II the second semester. Students who have completed Geometry in the 8th grade can choose between Financial Literacy and AP Microeconomics to occupy their first semester, both of which satisfy the financial literacy requirement for graduation.
AP Biology
Computer Programming & Engineering Design - Also a combined course in which the first semester concentrates on computer science which is mostly of the programming language C++. The second semester focuses on engineering design or drafting.

Sophomore year
AP Statistics 
Honors Precalculus
AP Chemistry

Junior year
AP Computer Science A
AP Calculus BC
AP Physics C: Mechanics
Honors Electronics

Senior year
AP Physics C: Electricity and Magnetism
Honors Multivariable Calculus
Honors Engineering Research (with internship)

References

External links 

Manalapan High School website

Englishtown, New Jersey
1985 establishments in New Jersey
Educational institutions established in 1985
Magnet schools in New Jersey
Public high schools in Monmouth County, New Jersey